The International Graphical Federation (IGF) was a global union federation bringing together unions of printing workers around the world.

History
Moved to establish the federation began in 1939, when the Lithographers' International, International Typographers' Secretariat, and International Federation of Bookbinders and Kindred Trades, agreed to merge.  However, due to World War II, no progress was made until 1946, when the British Printing and Kindred Trades Federation established a committee which drafted a constitution for a merged organisation.

The federation was established at its first meeting, in Stockholm in 1949.  It agreed to operate on a non-political basis, instead focusing on responses to technical developments in the industry, and sharing information on industrial disputes, employment and health and safety standards in each country.

The federation had three boards, covering typography, lithography and bookbinding, and each agreed policies which were put to the body's congress.  An executive committee with fifteen members co-ordinated the federation's activities, while a bureau of the general secretary, president, and four representatives of the country in which the headquarters were located, ran the organisation between executive committee meetings.

The IGF affiliated to the International Confederation of Free Trade Unions (ICFTU), but its membership was suspended in 1967, as it had permitted the French Federation of Book Workers, a communist union from France, to affiliate.

At the end of 1999, the federation merged with the Communications International, the International Federation of Employees, Technicians and Managers, and the Media and Entertainment International, to form Union Network International.

Affiliates
In 1979, the following unions were affiliated to the federation:

Leadership

Secretaries
1949: Karl Woerler
1964: Heinz Göke
1981: Alfred Kaufmann
1990: Bob Tomlins
1994: Chris Pate
1997: Olav Boye

Chairs
1949: Adolf Schäfer
1955: Friedrich Segessenmann
1958: Ernst Leuenberger
1967: John Bonfield
1976: Leonhard Mahlein
1983: Erwin Ferlemann
1994: Rene van Tilborg

References

Trade unions established in 1949
Trade unions disestablished in 1999
Global union federations
Printing trade unions